This is a list of politicians murdered in the Mexican drug war. Since the start of the military-led offensive by the Mexican government in 2006, the drug trafficking organizations have slaughtered their rivals, killed policemen and now increasingly targeted politicians – especially local leaders. Most of the places where these politicians have been killed are areas plagued by drug-related violence. Part of the strategy used by the criminal groups behind the killings of local figures is the weakening of the local governments.

Extreme violence puts politicians at the mercy of the mafias, and thus allowing the cartels to take control of the fundamental government structures and expand their criminal agendas. In addition, because mayors usually appoint local police chiefs, they are seen by the cartels as key assets in their criminal activities to control the police forces in their areas of influence. The cartels also seek to control the local governments to win government contracts and concessions; these "public works" help them ingrain themselves in the community and gain the loyalty and respect of the communities in which they operate.

Currently, the criminal organizations in Mexico earn a substantial amount of money from extortion and retail drug sales, known in Spanish as "narco-menudeo." Unlike the transnational drug trade, which can be carried out without the aid and protection of authorities, local police forces are more likely to be aware of the local extortions and drug sales. Hence, government tolerance – and at times, government collusion – is necessary for the cartels to operate.

Politicians are usually targeted for three reasons: (1) Political figures who are honest pose a direct threat to organized crime, and are consequently killed by the cartels; (2) Politicians make arrangements to protect a certain cartel and are killed by a rival cartel; and (3) a cartel simply kills politicians to heat up the turf of the rival cartel that operates in the area.

Another issue behind the assassination of politicians is that Mexico is more democratic than how it used to be a couple of decades ago, when the Institutional Revolutionary Party (PRI) ruled Mexico uninterruptedly for more than six decades. Today, the criminals groups have to deal with three major political parties, posing challenges to the long-relationships the cartels had during the past regime. Drug-related assassinations are not solely limited to local and low-profile politicians. As demonstrated with the killing of Rodolfo Torre Cantú in June 2010, a candidate for the PRI who was running for the state government of Tamaulipas, drug lords are interfering with Mexico's election process.

88 politicians or candidates were killed between September 2020 and the June 2021 Mexican legislative election.

List

Notes
A municipal president is comparable to a mayor of a town or city.
A deputy is a member of the Chamber of Deputies of Mexico.
Politicians who are reported as "disappeared" are included in the list with a note in References box.

Presidency of Vicente Fox

Presidency of Felipe Calderon

Presidency of Enrique Peña Nieto

Presidency of Ándres Manuel López Obrador

See also 
 History of Mexico
 Index of Mexico-related articles
 Political murder
 List of journalists and media workers killed in Mexico

Notes

References

External links
 Mexico's missing local election candidates — Al Jazeera on YouTube
 Mexico: Drug Cartels Have Growing Stake In Mexican Politics (archive) — The Huffington Post
 Why are Mexican mayors getting killed by traffickers? (archive) — Viridiana Ríos, Harvard University
 Mexico drug war worsened by organized crime's tight grip on politics (archive) — The Christian Science Monitor

 
Killed, Mexican Drug War
Lists of 21st-century people